Ancylosis subpyrethrella is a species of snout moth in the genus Ancylosis. It was described by Ragonot in 1888, and is known from Namibia and South Africa.

References

Moths described in 1888
subpyrethrella
Insects of Namibia
Moths of Africa